In Greek mythology, Zeuxo (Ancient Greek: Ζευξώ means 'yoke' or 'cart') was one of the 3,000 Oceanids, water-nymph daughters of the Titans Oceanus and his sister-spouse Tethys. Her name appears in Hesiod's catalogue of Oceanid names; no other literary mention of her survives.

See also 
Meanings of minor planet names: 1–500
Brygos Painter

Oceanids

Notes

References 

 Hesiod, Theogony from The Homeric Hymns and Homerica with an English Translation by Hugh G. Evelyn-White, Cambridge, MA.,Harvard University Press; London, William Heinemann Ltd. 1914. Online version at the Perseus Digital Library. Greek text available from the same website.
Kerényi, Carl, The Gods of the Greeks, Thames and Hudson, London, 1951.